Christian Gottlieb Reichard (26 June 1758 – 11 September 1837) was a German cartographer born in Schleiz, Thuringia. He studied law in Leipzig and subsequently became a city official in Bad Lobenstein.

With Adolf Stieler (1775-1836), he collaborated on the first edition of "Stieler's Handatlas", which was a 50-map project that was published between 1817 and 1823. Other significant geographical works by Reichard include:
 Atlas Des Ganzen Erdkreises in der Central Projection (contains a rare 1803 North Polar projection).
 Charte von Nord America: nach den neuesten Bestimmungen und Entdeckungen, (Weimar, 1804).
 "Map of the World after Mercator's projection"; 1825 (4 parts).
 "Orbis terrarum antiquus", 1824 (Atlas of the antique world).

References
 Biography, translated from German

Reichard Christian Gottlieb
Reichard Christian Gottlieb
Reichard Christian Gottlieb
Scientists from Thuringia
People from Schleiz